The Maryland–Virginia football rivalry is an American college football rivalry between the Maryland Terrapins and Virginia Cavaliers. The Terrapins and Cavaliers first met in 1919 and the series has been played annually without interruption since 1957, although the series' future is in doubt beyond 2013 because of Maryland leaving the Atlantic Coast Conference (ACC) for the Big Ten Conference in 2014.

Maryland leads the series 44–32–2, although Virginia is 15–7 since 1991. Maryland possesses the longest winning streak of the series, sixteen games between 1972 and 1987, while Virginia has the second longest streak with nine consecutive wins ending in 2000.

The schools jointly announced a home-home series in 2017 that would be played during the 2023 and 2024 seasons.

Background

Contributing factors

Several factors contribute to the intensity of the rivalry. The two states, and their eponymous flagship universities based in Charlottesville, Virginia and College Park, Maryland, respectively, share close historical and cultural ties. Due in large part to this proximity, the schools aggressively compete for recruits in the Mid-Atlantic region. Former Maryland coach Ralph Friedgen expressed the importance of the rivalry by stating, "It's a potential rivalry in every sport we play. They're border states. We compete for students, not just athletes."

The two are both long-time members of the Atlantic Coast Conference, with Maryland becoming a founding member in 1953 and Virginia joining later in that same year. When the conference reorganized in 2005, Maryland and Virginia were placed in separate divisions, but designated as cross-divisional rivals that continue to meet annually. The intensity of the rivalry is increased by a long history in the series of comebacks, shutouts, and spoilers that prevented one team from securing a conference championship or bowl game appearance. From the 1920s until 1945, the teams competed for the Tydings Trophy, named for former politician and Maryland alum Millard Tydings who had several friends amongst the professors at Virginia. In 2003, the schools discussed reviving the trophy tradition, but it was ultimately rejected by Virginia, due to concerns over the reorganization of the ACC.

Before and after their meeting in 2010, players from both schools attributed the importance of the game to the negative feelings the programs have for each other. Virginia center Anthony Mihota said "I guess it's because we don't like them very much. Something about them that gets under our skin".  After Maryland's victory, Terp linebacker Adrian Moten commented, "This was a big win in the rivalry. They hate us. We hate them."

The high academic standing of the University of Virginia in a national publication has added to the competitiveness between the two. In 2003, University of Maryland president C.D. Mote asserted that, in academic terms, Virginia was "highly overrated these days ... U.S. News & World Report places them at the top of the pile with Berkeley, which is ridiculous." Mote further stated that students from the state of Maryland paying a higher tuition cost to attend the University of Virginia "don’t know any better." While the University of Virginia president, John Casteen, said such remarks can be taken out of context, Virginia board of visitors member, William H. Goodwin, responded in The Cavalier Daily, "I certainly think a college president should have more class, but you have to expect that from Maryland."

Relative importance
Former Virginia head coach Al Groh stopped short of calling the game with Maryland a 'rivalry', but said that "it is a very important game to our team and it is our annual game. So that certainly designates it as being different from the other games." Maryland head coach Ralph Friedgen conceded that "[Virginia has] Virginia Tech as an in-state rivalry, but I think we're their out-of-state rivalry."

Maryland–Virginia is the second most played out-of-state rivalry for Virginia, after the longest standing rivalry in the ACC, the South's Oldest Rivalry between Virginia and North Carolina. It is the fourth most played for the Cavaliers overall, after North Carolina, Virginia Tech (Commonwealth Cup), and Virginia Military Institute. In contrast, Maryland–Virginia is the most-played historical series for Maryland.

Noteworthy games

1945
Maryland 19, Virginia 13

In 1945, the two teams met for a neutral site match-up at Griffith Stadium in Washington, D.C. Head coach Frank Murray, a future Hall of Fame inductee, had led 13th-ranked Virginia to a perfect 7–0 record. The Cavaliers also held an undefeated streak of fourteen games. Bear Bryant was in his only year as Maryland's head coach. Maryland's Sam Behr broke away for a 90-yard touchdown run, but Virginia held the lead in the fourth quarter. In the final seconds of play, Terrapin freshman tailback Bill "Red" Poling completed a forward pass to end Don Gleasner for a 50-yard score. With the win, Maryland tied the all-time series record. The 19–13 loss to Maryland ended Virginia's perfect season and they fell to 20th place in the AP Poll. After this game, the series went on hiatus for 11 years, and it was the last year the Tydings Trophy was awarded.

1961
Virginia 28, Maryland 16

Tom Nugent's Terps entered their last season game boasting a 7–2 record that included a win over seventh-ranked Syracuse with Heisman Trophy-winner Ernie Davis and the only victory over Penn State until 2014. They faced a Virginia team that started off their season by breaking a three-year, 28-game losing streak against William & Mary. The Cavaliers had lost the last three meetings against Maryland by an average of 38 points. With a win against Virginia, the Terps would secure the ACC title and a trip to the Gator Bowl. After Maryland scored for an early lead, Virginia quarterback Gary Cuozzo tossed three short touchdown passes to third-string receiver John Hepler. Defensive back Ted Rzempoluch returned an interception 95 yards for a touchdown, and sealed the Terps' fate to go bowl-less. The other three-loss team in the ACC, Duke, won the conference.

1988
Virginia 24, Maryland 23

In the final minutes of the game, with the Terps trailing the Cavaliers 24–17, Maryland quarterback Neil O'Donnell was injured and taken out of the game. He was replaced by a young second-stringer Scott Zolak. Zolak led a drive which culminated with a three-yard option run for a touchdown narrowing the deficit to a point. With 1:09 left in the game, Maryland went for two. Zolak threw into the endzone to running back Ricky Johnson. Johnson appeared to catch the ball before being hit by defensive back Keith McMeans, knocking the ball loose. An official in the endzone immediately signaled for a catch, before others waved it as incomplete. After the game, the usually level-headed Terps head coach Joe Krivak ran to the official who made the initial call, following him to the locker room, and then ran over to yell at referee Don Safrit. Several witnesses claim he said to the officials that "If it takes every ounce of energy, I'm going to get you out of this league." Virginia (7–4) broke their 16-game losing streak in the series and finished second in the conference. Maryland (5–6) failed to achieve a winning season for the third consecutive year. However, the Cavaliers failed to secure a bowl game berth, while N.C. State with a worse record went on to the Peach Bowl.

1990
Maryland 35, Virginia 30

Besieged Maryland head coach Joe Krivak, with a 17–25 record, led his Terps (5–5) to a sold-out Scott Stadium in Charlottesville for their final regular season game. George Welsh's eighth-ranked Virginia (8–1) had spent three weeks atop the AP poll at number-one until a loss against Georgia Tech. At halftime, Maryland trailed 21–7. Then freshman reserve running back Mark Mason put the Terps back in the game with a 59-yard touchdown breakaway, and a team best run for the year. Maryland quarterback Scott Zolak threw for two more touchdowns and Mason scored the go-ahead with an 8-yard rush to put the Terps ahead 35–30. With the win, Maryland secured a bowl berth for the first time since Bobby Ross left four seasons prior. Virginia took a nose-dive in the AP rankings to 17th, and after another loss to Virginia Tech settled for the Sugar Bowl where they were edged by Tennessee, 23–22.

1999
Virginia 34, Maryland 30

After starting 5–2, Maryland suffered a three-game losing streak before their finale at Byrd Stadium. Maryland needed to beat Virginia to finish with a winning season and likely secure a berth in the Aloha Bowl or Oahu Bowl. At the end of the first quarter, Virginia led 17–0. Maryland's freshman quarterback Latrez Harrison was pulled and replaced by former safety Randall Jones. Jones along with Heisman prospect running back LaMont Jordan led the Terps to tie it at 17 before halftime. In the third quarter, Jordan ran 90 yards to make it 24–17, but the Cavaliers tied it soon after. With 5:18 left, Terps kicker Brian Kopka made a field goal to make it 30–27. In the next series, Virginia went for it on fourth down but a Dan Ellis pass was incomplete. The Terps took over on downs with 1:40 left. Victory seemed assured, but Maryland failed to convert a first down and the inexperienced Randall Jones ran out of bounds on third down, which stopped the clock when Virginia had no time-outs. The Cavaliers got the ball on their own 24-yard line. In nine plays and just 46 seconds, Dan Ellis led a 76-yard drive that culminated with a touchdown pass to Billy McMullen to win the game with 26 seconds left. The 34–30 loss dashed the Terrapins' hopes for their first bowl game since 1990. After the game, Maryland coach Ron Vanderlinden remarked "Devastating. The worst loss I've ever been associated with because of what was on the line."

2002
Virginia 48, Maryland 13

After Terps head coach Ralph Friedgen stated Maryland expected to "beat teams like Duke and Virginia", the Cavs sought vindication for the comparison to ACC football's perpetual underdog. While Maryland's Scott McBrien passed for a touchdown in the first series, Virginia went on to score 20 unanswered points in the second quarter with two Matt Schaub passes and two field goals. In the second half, the Cavaliers delivered four more touchdowns: another Schaub pass, a pass by receiver Billy McMullen, and two short rushing scores. The Terps only managed to use Nick Novak to make two field goals. The loss broke Maryland's eight-game winning streak, and prevented them from sharing a piece of the ACC championship. Instead, Florida State finished with a better conference record (7–1), and secured the title outright.

2003
Maryland 27, Virginia 17

With leading rusher Bruce Perry out due to a sprained ankle, Terps running back Josh Allen adeptly filled in, and racked up 257 yards and two touchdowns. Virginia quarterback Matt Schaub threw for a touchdown and ran for another, but his second-half comeback attempt ultimately fell short. In the game, Schaub overtook Shawn Moore's career passing record at the school. There was also some excitement even before the game started. Maryland assistant coach James Franklin and Virginia head coach Al Groh had a heated exchange after a Cavaliers player interrupted the Terps' warm up drills. Then, after Virginia won the coin toss, Al Groh infamously elected to kick off to start both halves. Immediately after the decision, the entire Maryland team rushed the field in celebration and was given a 15-yard unsportsmanlike conduct penalty before the opening kickoff. The win kept the Terps' ACC title hopes alive, but Florida State narrowly beat N.C. State 50–44 to win the conference outright. Maryland finished second-place in the ACC.

2006
Maryland 28, Virginia 26

After giving up 255 yards, the Terps trailed 20–0 at halftime. Cavaliers punt returner Emmanuel Byers muffed a third-quarter punt to give Maryland possession on the Virginia one-yard line. Lance Ball rushed for a touchdown on the next play, and the Terps went on to score another 21 points in the final quarter to include a 56-yard breakaway by Keon Lattimore and a 45-yard pick-six by linebacker Erin Henderson. With 2:37 left on the clock, the Cavaliers responded with a 44-yard touchdown pass to Kevin Ogletree, to pull to 28–26. Virginia attempted a two-point conversion to send the game into overtime. Cornerback Josh Wilson, who was scored on twice earlier, broke up the pass to clinch the win for the Terps.

2007
Virginia 18, Maryland 17

Reserve sophomore running back Mikell Simpson racked up 119 yards rushing and two touchdowns to go along with 152 receiving yards, for 271 all-purpose yards, as 19th-ranked Virginia came from behind to defeat Maryland. The game ended when, with 16 seconds left, Simpson dived into the endzone as the ball was knocked out of his hands. It was ruled a touchdown and Virginia defeated Maryland. Terps coach Ralph Friedgen said "I saw the ball come out on the goal line. I saw it and I don't think he had possession." Simpson himself stated, "It crossed the line. I knew I scored because I looked down and saw the yellow line and I saw the ball cross [before] they hit it out." With the victory, the Cavaliers reached seven wins in a row for the first time since 1990 and for only the fourth time in school history. They also accomplished the feat in 1914 and 1949. That season, Virginia won an NCAA record of five games by two points or less, with the other edged teams being North Carolina, Middle Tennessee State, Connecticut, and Wake Forest.

Game results

See also
 List of NCAA college football rivalry games
 Maryland–Virginia lacrosse rivalry
 Maryland–Virginia men's soccer rivalry

References

College football rivalries in the United States
Maryland Terrapins football
Virginia Cavaliers football
Maryland Terrapins rivalries